The ISM Connect 300 was a Monster Energy NASCAR Cup Series stock car race that was , traditionally held in mid-September at the New Hampshire Motor Speedway in Loudon, New Hampshire, the other one being the Ambetter 301 in July.

The New England 300 also has the distinction of being the only NASCAR Cup Series points race outside Daytona and Talladega to run a restrictor plate race since the adoption of the current 358 cubic inch formula. After Adam Petty's fatal crash in the Busch Series practice on May 12, 2000, and Kenny Irwin Jr.'s fatal crash in the Cup Series practice on July 7, 2000, NASCAR decided to run restrictor plates, already used for the Whelen Modified Tour races at the circuit, for the 2000 Cup race, then known as the Dura Lube 300 sponsored by Kmart. Adding restrictor plates did have the desired result of slowing down the cars drastically, but at the same time, restricted passing so much that Jeff Burton led all 300 laps. This lack of passing was so noncompetitive that, for Cup cars only, the restrictor plates were gone for the very next race, the 2001 New England 300.

From 2004 until 2010, the race served as the opening round of the Monster Energy NASCAR Cup Series playoffs, a ten-race "playoff" designed among the top ten (twelve as of 2007) drivers in the standings of the series following the Chevy Rock and Roll 400 to spur interest in a championship series while NASCAR faces competition from the start of the NFL season and college football, the pennant races and post-season of Major League Baseball and the outset of the NHL and NBA seasons. Beginning with the 2011 Chase, the race became the second race in the ten-race playoff; as in part of a new round of schedule realignment the Overton's 400 at Chicagoland Speedway moved from its traditional early July race date. On March 8, 2017 it was announced that the fall NHMS date would move to Las Vegas Motor Speedway starting in 2018.

History
The first race in September came at the expense of the fall race at North Wilkesboro Speedway which was one of eight tracks from the original 1949 season, this race which took the date from North Wilkesboro, has its lineage starting in 1949 with the inaugural schedule. The first race was run here in 1997, won by Jeff Gordon, who also coincidentally won the last race at North Wilkesboro the year before.

2000 Dura Lube 300 Presented by Kmart

This was the first NASCAR Cup Series race held since the deaths of Adam Petty and Kenny Irwin Jr. at this track. NASCAR used restrictor plates for this race as a result, in an effort to slow the top speed of the cars. However, cautions were so frequent and passing was so slowed that outside polesitter Jeff Burton led all 300 laps. This is the only race to date on a short track that had used restrictor plates. They were not used again after this race.

2001 New Hampshire 300

The 2001 fall race, originally scheduled for September 16, 2001, was postponed due to the 9/11 terror attacks. Not wanting to cancel the event outright, NASCAR decided to reschedule the race to the next available date. Since there were no scheduled off weeks between then and the end of the season, NASCAR's only option was the weekend of November 23–25, 2001, Thanksgiving weekend.

This created an interesting challenge for Goodyear, the tire manufacturer, as they were not expecting to run a race in New Hampshire in November. With the potential for a much colder raceday than they would have had in September at Loudon, and taking into account the possibility for snow, Goodyear brought a tire that they hoped would be better suited to the cold conditions. NASCAR announced the rescheduled race date would be Friday, November 23, the day after Thanksgiving, to allow for potential weather-related rescheduling. NBC was to carry the race live in the Eastern, Central, and Mountain time zones, with a tape delay for the Pacific time zone to accommodate the third hour of Today.

However, NASCAR's concerns were unfounded as the race was run in unseasonably mild conditions with temperatures in the 50s. NASCAR didn't conduct a traditional qualifying event for this race, instead choosing to employ a modified version of its method used when qualifying is canceled due to weather. To set the field for the race the cars that were holding the top 43 positions in the standings following the September 8 Chevrolet Monte Carlo 400 at Richmond automatically qualified for the race. Only 42 of those cars started the race, as 43rd-place Eel River Racing had folded shortly after the Richmond race.

The race saw Robby Gordon, driving the #31 Chevrolet for Richard Childress Racing, win his first ever race in NASCAR, and was marked by an incident in which he and Jeff Gordon got tangled together late in the race which put Robby into the lead. Jeff, who had been running up front all day, hit Robby during a caution flag to retaliate and finished in the middle of the pack (although it was all moot, as Gordon had clinched the 2001 Winston Cup championship at Atlanta the week before).

2003 Sylvania 300
The 2003 race marked the last time that the long-standing NASCAR rule of racing back to a yellow caution flag was in place. During the race, Dale Jarrett spun and hit the wall in turn 4 and came to rest in the middle of the racetrack's front stretch. Leaders slowed down except Michael Waltrip, who attempted to put several cars a lap down; he and others raced past Jarrett's immobilized car at full speed and some barely avoided contact with him. Beginning with the next race, the MBNA America 400 at Dover, in addition to other rule changes for the NASCAR Cup Series, Busch, and Truck series, NASCAR outlawed racing back to the caution. Instead, NASCAR froze the field immediately at the caution and allowed the first car one lap down (or multiple laps down, if there were no cars one lap down) to rejoin the lead lap; this is officially called the "free pass" by NASCAR but is widely known by fans and journalists as the "lucky dog" rule.

2004 Sylvania 300

The 2004 Sylvania 300 was the first time drivers raced in the Chase for the Nextel Cup format. Rain cancelled qualifying, prompting the grid to be set from owner's points. Jeff Gordon led them down to the green flag. Afterward, Greg Biffle got in the back of Robby Gordon sending Gordon spinning. Later in the race Robby Gordon spun Biffle collecting Chase contenders Tony Stewart and Jeremy Mayfield. Robby Gordon was penalized two laps for aggressive driving. Kurt Busch won the race to start his run toward his first Nextel Cup Series championship.

2017 ISM Connect 300

The 2017 race marked the last time that NASCAR would come here in the fall for the second race in the Playoffs. On March 8, 2017 it was announced that the fall NHMS date would move to Las Vegas Motor Speedway starting in 2018. Kyle Busch dominated and won the race.

Past winners

Notes
2001: Race postponed from September 16 to November 23 due to 9/11.
2002: Race shortened due to rain.
2010: Clint Bowyer's was found to have illegal car modifications in the post-race inspection, and he was penalized 150 points, while crew chief Shane Wilson was suspended four races.
2014: Race extended due to a NASCAR Overtime finish.

Multiple winners (drivers)

Multiple winners (teams)

Manufacturer wins

References

External links
 

1997 establishments in New Hampshire
 
NASCAR Cup Series races
Recurring sporting events established in 1997
Recurring sporting events disestablished in 2017
Former NASCAR races